Miss World Spain 2019 was the 7th edition of the Miss World Spain pageant, held on August 18, 2019. The winner was María Del Mar Aguilera Zuheros of Córdoba and she represented Spain in Miss World 2019.

Final results

Ganadora prueba Multimedia: Jaen
Ganadora prueba Top Model: Pontevedra
Ganadora prueba deportiva: Gipuzkoa
Ganadora prueba traje regional: Segovia
Ganadora prueba Talento: Sevilla

Official Delegates

Notes

Returns
Last competed in 2017:
 Burgos
 Canary Islands

Withdrawals

Did not compete
 Aragón
 Galicia

References

External links

Miss Spain
2019 in Spain
2019 beauty pageants